Genotrichia is a genus of parasitic flies in the family Tachinidae. There are at least two described species in Genotrichia.

Species
These two species belong to the genus Genotrichia:
 Genotrichia minor Malloch, 1938
 Genotrichia tonnoiri Malloch, 1938

References

Further reading

 
 
 
 

Tachinidae
Articles created by Qbugbot